The 1961 Brown Bears football team was an American football team that represented Brown University during the 1961 NCAA University Division football season. Brown went winless and finished last in the Ivy League. 

In their third season under head coach John McLaughry, the Bears compiled a 0–9 record and were outscored 245 to 24. N.J. Rohrback was the team captain.  

The Bears' 0–7 conference record placed eighth in the Ivy League standings. They were outscored by Ivy opponents 203 to 9. 

Brown played its home games at Brown Stadium in Providence, Rhode Island.

Schedule

References

Brown
Brown Bears football seasons
College football winless seasons
Brown Bears football